The Sony Xperia E1 is a low range Android smartphone designed and manufactured by Sony, with emphasis put on its loudspeakers. Under the codename Falcon SS and board Shuang, it was announced on January 14, 2014, along with the Sony Xperia T2 Ultra, and was marketed as a music-centric phone. Released during the first quarter of 2014, the Xperia E1 has a dual SIM variant named the Xperia E1 Dual.

Hardware
The Xperia E1 features a 4-inch TFT capacitive touchscreen display with a resolution of 800 by 480 pixels and a pixel density of 233 ppi. It has a 3.15 megapixels camera capable of HDR pictures, 4 times smooth zoom and smile detection. On the inside, the Xperia E1 features a 1.2 GHz dual-core Qualcomm Snapdragon 200 processor, a 1,750mAh Li-Ion battery, 512MB of RAM, 4GB of internal storage and microSD support up to 32GB. Weighing 120 g, the device measures 118 mm by 62.4 mm by 12 mm. The phone includes an FM Radio and, for connectivity, Bluetooth 4.0.

Due to the phone itself being music centric, the Xperia E1 includes a dedicated Walkman button found atop the phone that controls the Walkman application and a shaking gesture that handles track navigation. It also includes a speaker capable of producing sounds up to 100 decibels.

Software
The Xperia E1 comes with Sony's stock Android 4.3 (Jellybean) with some notable applications additions such as Sony's Media applications (Walkman, Album and Videos). Additionally, the device also includes Sony's battery stamina mode which increases the phone's standby time up to 4 times. Several Google applications (such as Google Chrome, Google Play, Google Voice Search, Google Search, Google Maps for Mobile with Street view and Latitude, Google Talk application) also come preloaded with the device.

Variants

See also
Sony Xperia E
Sony Xperia T2 Ultra

References

External links
Xperia E1 on Sony Mobile Communications 

Android (operating system) devices
Sony smartphones
Discontinued smartphones